Devdas is a 1955 Indian Hindi-language period drama film directed by Bimal Roy, based on the Sarat Chandra Chattopadhyay novel Devdas. It starred Dilip Kumar in the titular role, Suchitra Sen in her Bollywood debut as Parvati "Paro", Vyjayanthimala in her first dramatic role where she played courtesan named Chandramukhi. Motilal, Nazir Hussain, Murad, Pratima Devi, Iftekhar, Shivraj were playing other significant roles along with Pran, Johnny Walker in extended cameo appearances.

In 2005, Indiatimes Movies ranked the movie amongst the Top 25 Must See Bollywood Films. Devdas was also ranked at #2 on University of Iowa's List of Top 10 Bollywood Films by Corey K. Creekmur. The film was also noted for its cinematography and lighting under Kamal Bose, that enhanced the emotional torment of the tight-lipped protagonist played by Dilip Kumar. Forbes included Kumar's performance in the film on its list, "25 Greatest Acting Performances of Indian Cinema". Although Devdas was a moderate success at the box-office when initially released, partly due to its heavy theme and release of several Kumar's films around the same time including Azaad (1955), Uran Khatola (1955), and Insaniyat (1955), it found greater success in re-releases in subsequent years up till 1980s. The subsequent popularity of the film made the role essayed by Kumar amongst his most famous. The particular version of Devdas is considered to be the best-known and finest rendering of the novel.

Plot
Set against the backdrop of rural Bengal during feudal times, Devdas is a young man from a Minor Zamindar Bengali  family in India in the early 1900s. Paro, alias Parvati is a young woman from a middle-class Bengali Brahmin family, but belonging to a slightly lower status in terms of caste, affluence, and status. The two families lived in a village, and Devdas and Paro were childhood friends.

Devdas goes away for some years to live and study in a boarding school in the city of Calcutta (now Kolkata). When, after finishing school, Devdas (Dilip Kumar) returns to his village, Paro (Suchitra Sen) looks forward to their childhood love blossoming into their lifelong journey together in marriage. Of course, according to the prevailing social custom, Paro's parents would have to approach Devdas' parents and propose a marriage of Paro to Devdas as Paro has longed for.

When Paro's grandmother (Sarita Devi) makes the proposal to Devdas' mother (Pratima Devi), the latter rejects her. To demonstrate his own social status, Paro's father, Nilkant (Shivraj) then finds an even richer husband for Paro.

When Paro learns of her planned marriage, she risks her honor to meet Devdas at night, desperately believing that Devdas will quickly accept her hand in marriage. Devdas meekly seeks his parents' permission to marry Paro, but Devdas' family was against him.

In a weak-minded state, Devdas then flees to Calcutta, and from there, he writes a letter to Paro, saying that they were only friends and there was no love between them. But soon realizing his mistake, he goes back to the village and tells Paro that he is ready to do anything needed to save their love.

By now, Paro's marriage plans are in an advanced stage, and she declines to go back to Devdas and chides him for his cowardice and vacillation. Parvati's marriage is finalized with a wealthy zamindar and widower (Moni Chatterjee) with children older than his young second wife-to-be.

In Calcutta, Devdas' carousing friend, Chunni Babu (Motilal), introduces him to a courtesan named Chandramukhi (Vyjayanthimala). Devdas takes to heavy drinking at Chandramukhi's place, but the courtesan falls in love with him and looks after him. His health deteriorates because of a combination of excessive drinking and despair of life — a drawn-out form of suicide. Within him, he frequently compares Paro and Chandramukhi, remaining ambivalent as to whom he really loves.

Sensing his fast-approaching death, Devdas returns to meet Paro to fulfill a vow that he would see her before he dies. He dies at her doorstep on a dark, cold night. On hearing of the death of Devdas, Paro runs towards the door, disregarding "purdah", but her family members prevent her from stepping out of the door.

The movie powerfully depicts the prevailing social customs in Bengal in the early 1900s, which are largely responsible for preventing the happy ending of a genuine love story.

Cast
 Dilip Kumar as Devdas
 Suchitra Sen as Parvati "Paro"
 Vyjayanthimala as Chandramukhi
 Motilal as Chunnilal
 Nazir Hussain as Dharamdas
 Murad as Zamindar Narayan
 Pratima Devi as Harimati
 Shivraj as Neelkanth
 Iftekhar as Dwijdas
 Kanhaiyalal as teacher
 Sarita Devi as Paro's grandmother
 Moni Chatterjee as Bhuvan Choudhury
 Nana Palsikar as Street Singer
 Dulari as Street Singer
 Parveen Paul as Devdas' sister-in-law
 Pran as Chandramukhi's Patron
 Johnny Walker as Chandramukhi's Patron
 Naaz as Young Parvati

Production
Dilip Kumar was Bimal Roy's first choice for the role of Devdas. Roy wanted Meena Kumari as Paro, and Nargis as Chandramukhi, but, Meena Kumari could not take the role because her husband Kamal Amrohi laid down certain conditions which Roy did not agree with. Nargis rejected the role of Chandramukhi as she wanted to play Paro. The role of Paro was already given to Suchitra Sen. Bina Rai and Suraiya were approached to play Chandramukhi, who refused the role for the same reason as Nargis. Ultimately, Vyjayanthimala was approached and she agreed to play Chandramukhi. About Vyjayanthimala's casting, script writer Nabendu Ghosh said:"I did not approve of Vyjayanthimala [as Chandramukhi], but we had no option – no one wanted to play Chandramukhi, and we were committed to our distributors. We were in dire straits, and Bimalda's unit was big. He never compromised in the making [of his film]. That meant expenses. And we needed money."

Soundtrack
The Soundtrack of Devdas consists of 12 songs composed by S. D. Burman and the lyrics were penned by the veteran poet-lyricist Sahir Ludhianvi. Some of the songs were inspired by the Baul tradition. Apart from this, it also features some Thumris at Chandramukhi's place as to demonstrate tawaif culture.

Awards

Bibliography

References

External links
 
 Devdas review
 "An analysis of the film at Let's talk about Bollywood"

1955 films
1950s Hindi-language films
Devdas films
Films scored by S. D. Burman
Films directed by Bimal Roy
Films set in Kolkata
Indian romantic drama films
Films based on Indian novels
Indian epic films
1955 romantic drama films
Films about courtesans in India
Indian black-and-white films